Donald Ray Kinder (born April 14, 1947) is an American political scientist and the Philip E. Converse Professor in the Department of Political Science at the University of Michigan. He is also a professor by courtesy in the University of Michigan's Department of Psychology, and a research professor in the University of Michigan Institute for Social Research's Center for Political Studies. In 2017, he was elected to the National Academy of Sciences.

Books
(with Shanto Iyengar) News that Matters: Television and American Public Opinion (University of Chicago Press, 1987)
(with Cindy Kam) Us Against Them: Ethnocentric Foundations of American Opinion (University of Chicago Press, 2010)

References

External links
Faculty page

Living people
1947 births
Members of the United States National Academy of Sciences
University of Michigan faculty
Stanford University alumni
University of California, Los Angeles alumni
American political scientists